

Y

Notes
  YEA is common IATA code for Edmonton International Airport  and former Edmonton City Centre Airport .
  Lloydminster city is incorporated by both provinces as a single city with a single municipal administration. Lloydminster Airport is located northwest of the city, in Alberta province.
  YMQ is common IATA code for Montréal–Pierre Elliott Trudeau International Airport , Montréal–Mirabel International Airport  and Montreal Saint-Hubert Longueuil Airport .
  YTO is common IATA code for Toronto Pearson International Airport , John C. Munro Hamilton International Airport , Region of Waterloo International Airport , Billy Bishop Toronto City Airport  and Buttonville Municipal Airport .

References

  - includes IATA codes
 
 Aviation Safety Network - IATA and ICAO airport codes
 Great Circle Mapper - IATA, ICAO and FAA airport codes

Y